A curb stomp, also called curbing, curb checking, curb painting, or making someone bite the curb, is a form of assault in which a victim's mouth is forcefully placed on a curb and then stomped from behind, causing severe injuries and sometimes death.

Notable incidents 
 In July 2002, 16-year-old German Marinus Schöberl was tortured by young neo-Nazis in an abandoned pigsty in Oberuckersee (in the German state of Brandenburg) and was killed after being curb-stomped. The main perpetrator, who was 17 at the time of the killing, was released after serving eight years in prison.

 In 2003, Tacoma, Washington, resident Randall Townsend was murdered by four people. David Nikos Pillatos, Scotty James Butters, and Tristain Lynn Frye beat and kicked Townsend. Kurtis William Monschke curb-stomped Townsend, killing him. Monschke had recently been named head of the Washington chapter of Volksfront. "Prosecutors said the attack was meant to lift Monschke's status in the white supremacist movement and to earn Frye a pair of red shoelaces, with the red signifying the drawing of blood."
 Tristain Lynn Frye was sentenced to 13 years, nine months for second-degree murder.
 Scotty James Butters and David Nikos Pillatos pled guilty to first-degree murder, accepted a plea agreement and testified against Monschke in exchange for being able to request that their imprisonment be no more than approximately 30 years. In June 2004, the U.S. Supreme Court ruled "a sentence longer than the standard range could not be ordered by a judge without action by a jury, meaning Butters and Pillatos could face no more than 31 years in prison."
 Kurtis William Monschke was convicted of aggravated first degree murder and sentenced to life in prison without possibility of parole. The incident has been described as a hate crime.</p>

 On August 26, 2011, Dane Hall was curb stomped in an attack outside a gay bar in Salt Lake City, Utah. He lost six teeth and suffered a broken jaw as a result of the attack.

Cultural references 
In the film American History X (1998), white power skinhead Derek Vinyard curb-stomps Lawrence, a black burglar who had tried to steal his truck.

In The Sopranos episode "The Second Coming" (2007),
New Jersey mafia don Tony Soprano curb stomps New York mobster Salvatore "Coco" Cogliano for making lewd comments to his daughter.

WWE professional wrestler Seth Rollins used a curb stomp as his finishing move. Rollins said that he stopped using the move as "from a PR standpoint ... it was too perceptually violent ... I never hurt anyone with it. It was just something we didn't want kids trying on each other". On the January 15, 2018, edition of Monday Night Raw, Rollins brought the move back, now referred to simply as a "stomp".

In the Bollywood movie Shootout at Lokhandwala, a scene is depicted where Vivek Oberoi curb stomps a local resident who informs the police about Aslam (Oberoi's friend) who is encountered by the police.

References 

Crime
Assault